Romeo y Julieta is a brand of premium cigars, currently owned by Imperial Brands. The brand is currently owned by two Imperial Brands subsidiaries, Habanos S.A. in Cuba and Altadis in the Dominican Republic.

History 
The Romeo y Julieta marque was established in 1875 by Inocencio Alvarez and Manin García. The brand is the Spanish name for Shakespeare's famous tragedy, Romeo and Juliet.

Between 1885 and 1900, the brand won numerous awards at different tasting exhibitions (as still evidenced by the gold medals on the brand's logo). However, the brand truly bloomed after it was acquired by José "Pepin" Rodriguez Fernández, former head of the Cabañas factory in Havana, and his firm, Rodríguez, Argüelles y Cia, in 1903. Being a very cosmopolitan man, Rodriguez constantly travelled across Europe and the Americas, actively promoting his brand, and entering his horse, the aptly named Julieta, in racing events across the world.

As a result of his salesmanship, the brand became exceptionally popular around the world among wealthy customers, many of whom demanded personalized bands for their cigars. At its height, as many as 2000 personalized cigar bands were produced for customers. The brand was also known at this time for specializing in figurado cigars, such as perfectos and pirámides, with over a thousand such shapes believed to have been in production.

Sir Winston Churchill was perhaps the brand's most famous devotee. The flagship vitola of the brand is named in his honor, a long 7" by 47 ring gauge cigar known as the Churchill.

After Rodriguez's death in 1954 (he was 88 years old), the revolution, and the subsequent nationalization of the tobacco industry, the brand was moved to La Romana in the Dominican Republic, where production of a Romeo y Julieta cigar for the American market continues today under the direction of Altadis U.S.A. The Cuban government nationalized the brand and still produces and distributes it worldwide as one of its top-selling global brands.

Products

Vitolas in the Romeo y Julieta Line

The following list of vitolas de salida (commercial vitolas) within the Romeo y Julieta marque lists their size and ring gauge in Imperial (and Metric), their vitolas de galera (factory vitolas), and their common name in American cigar slang.

 Belicoso - 5" × 52 (140 × 20.64 mm), Campana, a belicoso
 Belvedere - 4" × 39 (124 × 15.48 mm), Belvedere, a short panetela
 Cazadores - 6" x 44 (162 x 17.46 mm), a lonsdale 
 Cedro de Luxe No. 1 - 6" × 42 (165 × 16.67 mm), Cervantes, a lonsdale
 Cedro de Luxe No. 2 - 5" × 42 (143 × 16.67 mm), Corona, a corona
 Cedro de Luxe No. 3 - 5" × 42 (130 × 16.67 mm), Mareva, a petit corona
 Churchill - 7" × 47 (178 × 18.65 mm), Julieta No. 2, a churchill
 Corona - 5" × 42 (143 × 16.67 mm), Corona, a corona
 Coronita en Cedro - 5" × 40 (130 × 15.88 mm), Petit Cetro, a petit corona
 Exhibición No. 3 - 5" × 46 (143 × 18.26 mm), Corona Gorda, a grand corona
 Exhibición No. 4 - 5" × 48 (127 × 19.05 mm), Hermoso No. 4, a corona extra
 Petit Corona - 5" × 42 (130 × 16.67 mm), Mareva, a petit corona
 Petit Julieta - 3" × 30 (98 × 11.91 mm), Entreacto, a small panetela
 Petit Princess - 4" × 40 (102 × 15.88 mm), Perlas, a petit corona
 Regalía de Londres - 4" × 40 (117 × 15.88 mm), Coronita, a petit corona
 Romeo No. 1 - 5" × 40 (140 × 15.88 mm), Crema, a corona
 Romeo No. 2 - 5" × 42 (130 × 16.67 mm), Petit Corona, a petit corona
 Romeo No. 3 - 4" × 40 (117 × 15.88 mm), Coronita, a petit corona
 Short Churchill - 4" × 50 (124 × 19.84 mm), Robusto, a robusto
 Sport Largo - 4" × 35 (117 × 13.89 mm), Sport, a short panetela
 Wide Churchill - 5" × 55 (130 × 21.83 mm) Montesco
Edición Limitada Releases
 Exhibición No. 2 (2000) - 7" × 49 (194 × 19.45 mm), Prominente, a double corona
 Robusto (2001) - 4" × 50 (124 × 19.84 mm), Robusto, a robusto
 Hermoso No. 1 (2003) - 6" × 48 (165 × 19.05 mm), Hermoso No. 1, a grand corona
 Hermoso No. 2 (2004) - 6" × 48 (156 × 19.05 mm), Hermoso No. 2, a grand corona
 Petit Pirámide (2005) - 5" × 50 (127 × 19.84 mm), Petit Pirámide, a petit pyramid
 Escudo (2007) - 5" × 50 (141 × 19.84 mm) Gordito, a robusto extra
 Duke (2009) - 5" × 54 (140 × 21.43 mm) Duke, a robusto extra

See also 
 Romeo y Julieta (cigarette)
 Cigar brands
 Gerald Garson, a judge bribed, in part, with Romeo y Julieta cigars

Bibliography
 Nee, Min Ron - An Illustrated Encyclopaedia of Post-Revolution Havana Cigars (2003, Reprinted: 2005),

References

External links

 
 Romeo y Julieta on Altadis USA
 The Color and Complexity of Cuba's Cigars on the CNN, April 9, 2007

Cuban brands
Habanos S.A. brands
Imperial Brands brands